Jeno Liu Liyang (born October 24, 1982) is a Chinese singer, DJ, producer and actress. Jeno first found popularity in the third season (2006) of a singing contest in China, Super Girls (Chinese: 超级女声) or Super Voice Girl. Polling over 350 thousand votes, she emerged as the champion of the Guang Zhou district competition, and was subsequently  crowned second runner up during the finals. Her charismatic personality and androgynous looks, paired with a soulful vocal, has won her a lot of fans, who are known as 'Li Zi' (Chinese:栗子, English: Chestnut), derived from her middle name 'Li'(力). On January 4, 2008, she joined HIM International Music. In 2012, she went abroad for learning DJ and production, and her music genre turned to more International with EDM element in production. After returning, she established a studio under her name and became the first female DJ star in China. In 2013, she worked with producers such as Dirtcaps, Freehand, Frankmusik and Dexter King and released singles such as "Set You Free" and "I Can't Live Without You". In 2017, she signed with Modernsky and became the biggest electronic artist under the label, and she released the fifth album Coulomb Law in which herself is a vocalist, songwriter and producer. Meanwhile, she was invited by KFC to sing their anthem.

Biography 
Jeno Liu was born on October 24, 1982, in Beijing, China. Born to a military family, she grew up bright and righteous, and once appeared in newspapers for having caught a thief

Jeno graduated from Luton University, England, with a degree in Advertising and Marketing.

Jeno is bilingual in Mandarin and English.

In her first advertisement, she broke her leg when performing a stunt and was hospitalised for a few months, putting her budding career on hold. That affected her singing career adversely as she could not take part in most of the Super Girl touring concerts. After a speedy recovery, she immediately returned to the recording studio.

In 2012, she went abroad for learning DJ and production, and her music genre turned to more International with EDM element in production. After returning, she established a studio under her name and became the first female DJ star in China. In 2013, she worked with producers such as Dirtcaps, Freehand, Frankmusik and Dexter King and released singles such as "Set You Free" and "I Can't Live Without You". In 2017, she signed with Modernsky and became the biggest electronic artist under the label, and she released the fifth album Coulomb Law in which herself is a vocalist, songwriter and producer. Meanwhile, she was invited by KFC to sing their anthem.
On April 20, 2019, Jeno Liu performed in Malaysia at the Arena of Stars in Genting Resorts as part of an ensemble Mandopop concert featuring other Mandarin pop singers. She wore an oversized green stripped outfit over an inner yellow outfit. Amongst the mandarin pieces she performed, she also performed an English piece. Many of her performances featured EDM.

Discography

專輯 Albums and EPs

未收录在专辑的单曲 Singles

Filmography

Films

References

External links
 HIM official forum: Liu Liyang
 Super Girls 2006: Liu Liyang

1982 births
Living people
Singers from Beijing
Super Girl contestants
Chinese television actresses
Actresses from Beijing